This is the complete list of men's European Short Course Swimming Championships medalists in swimming from 1991 to 2021. From 1991 to 1994 this event was held as the European Sprint Swimming Championships, where only the 50 meter events, the 100 meter individual medley, and both men's 4 × 50 meter relays were contested.

Current program

50 m freestyle

100 m freestyle

200 m freestyle

400 m freestyle

800 m freestyle

1500 m freestyle

50 m backstroke

100 m backstroke

200 m backstroke

50 m breaststroke

100 m breaststroke

200 m breaststroke

50 m butterfly

100 m butterfly

200 m butterfly

100 m individual medley

200 m individual medley

400 m individual medley

4 × 50 metre freestyle relay

4 × 50 metre medley relay

4 × 50 metre mixed freestyle relay

Each team consists of two men and two women, in any order.

4 × 50 metre mixed medley relay

Each team consists of two men and two women, in any order.

Discontinued events
Only at the European Sprint Swimming Championships 1993 in Gateshead, 4 × 50 m relays were held in every stroke.

4 × 50 metre backstroke relay

4 × 50 metre breaststroke relay

4 × 50 metre butterfly relay

See also
List of European Short Course Swimming Championships medalists (women)

References

European Short Course Swimming Championships
European Short Course Swimming Championships (men)
European Short Course Swimming Championships